Tirodi railway station serves Tirodi and surrounding villages in Balaghat of Madhya Pradesh, India.

References

Railway stations in Balaghat district
Nagpur SEC railway division